Mokhtar Dhouib (born 23 March 1952) is a retired Tunisian footballer.

He played for the Tunisia national football team in the 1978 FIFA World Cup. In Tunisia's first ever World Cup match, he scored the third goal in a 3–1 win over Mexico.

References

1952 births
Living people
Association football defenders
CS Sfaxien players
Al Nassr FC players
Tunisian Ligue Professionnelle 1 players
Saudi Professional League players
Tunisian footballers
Tunisia international footballers
1978 FIFA World Cup players
1978 African Cup of Nations players
Expatriate footballers in Saudi Arabia
Tunisian expatriate sportspeople in Saudi Arabia